Hitler Gari Pellam is an Indian Telugu language television series airs on Zee Telugu and streams on ZEE5. It premiered on 17 August 2020 and stars Gomathi Priya and Nirupam Paritala. The series is an official remake of Zee TV series Guddan Tumse Na Ho Payega.

Plot
The story revolves around Bhanumathi, a kind-hearted girl living in Bheemavaram, who in order to save her step-sister's life married a billionaire and famous cook, Abhinav Jagarlamudi (AJ). Bhanumathi lost her mother at a very young age and was brought up by her loving father and stepmother who strongly dislikes her. In a series of flashbacks, it was revealed that Bhanumathi considers herself guilty for being unable to save her birth mother.

On the other hand, Abhinav Jagarlamudi (AJ), a widower, is one of India's most famous and respected chefs who lost his first wife (Pravalika) very early in a traumatic accident which made him get cocooned in his own world. He is very serious-no nonsense kind of person who does not believe in emotions. He is also a father figure for his three nephews (off-springs of his elder brother) and their respective wives. They all fear him and call him Hitler.

When Bhanumathi married Abhinav Jagarlamudi, even though Abhinav did not like her and used to get irritated by her antics, he protected her and supported her when needed. She slowly develops self-confidence, and he begins to feel emotions he does not understand. Early in their marriage, Abhinav thought that Bhanu married him for his money; later, he begins to appreciate her innocence and kindness. As a result, Bhanu slowly regained her confidence and started believing in herself. Aj also started experiencing emotions with Bhanu which he couldn't seem to name. But as they started living together, he began to realize that she is an innocent and kind-hearted girl and starts loving her with a sweet understanding between each other.

Police officer Vikram (Vicky), Pravalika's elder brother, forced Bhanu to stay with Abhinav to collect evidence that he killed Pravalika. Although Bhanu hides her knowledge about Vikram's intentions from Abhinav and the rest of the family, she defends Abhinav when Vikram arrests him. Aj learns that Bhanu was staying at his house to gather evidence against him, and is heartbroken .

Aj takes a promise from Royyala Raju (Bhanumathi's Father) that after the marriage of Aj's cousin in law - Anjali (Bhanu's step sister), he will divorce Bhanumathi. According to Aj's wish he brought a marriage proposal for Anjali and was celebrating her marriage. Bhanu found out that Abhinav will divorce her after Anjali's marriage so tried to change Abhi's opinion on Bhanu, but as Bhanu hid few important things from Abhinav, Abhi's friend's sister who came to take revenge on Abhinav and his family thinking that Abhi is responsible for her brothers death, took advantage of it and made a big scene in Anjali's Marriage that Anjali has a ex- lover Badri who is relative of Abhinav and wanted to marry him. Devayani (Abhinav's Friend's Sister) told Aj that Bhanu was the one who knew all this and didn't even utter a word. As a result, Aj gave divorce papers to Bhanu and told her to meet him in the court and sent her back to her Home. Anjali would be Husband Defended Anjali and married her to take revenge from Abhinav by tottering Anjali.

Bhanu managed to get back to Aj house with the help of her uncle. Bhanu felt that Aj was hiding something from his family so she had to spy on him to and out the truth what he has been hiding. One day Aj himself revealed that he was taking care of a mentally ill patient name Suraj and took his responsibilities. Bhanu took a lot care of Suraj which amazed Aj and melted his heart. Bhanu wondered and was eager to find out who is Suraj and that led to a long distance between Aj and Bhanu. Later one day when Aj enemy's Appalakonda and Edukondalu kidnapped Suraj to get Abhinav's entire business. Though Aj signed on the documents to give his Business to Appalakonda, Appalakonda was about to shoot Suraj but Aj came in between to save Suraj and when Appalakonda was about to shoot Aj it was shot to Bhanu who came in defend him from getting him harmed. Aj understood that Bhanu truly loves him . They shared their feelings and showed trust on each other which made them to realize it was nothing but true love.

Cast

Main
 Gomathi Priya as Bhanumathi Abhinav Jagarlamudi (Bhanu also nicknamed by Hitler as Bekari) (2020–present)
 A kind-hearted and easy going girl, who married AJ and became AJ's wife, Jayamma's daughter-in-law, Dhaksha, Maya and Chitra's parental mother-in-law.  
 Nirupam Paritala as Abhinav Jagarlamudi (AJ also nicknamed by people around as Hitler) (2020–present)
 A professional cook, he always needs to be perfect. He first married Pravalika but she died. So as per Pravalika's final wish, he married Bhanu, Jayamma's son, Dhaksha, Maya and Chitra's parental father-in-law.

Recurring
 Sunandha Malasetti as Dhaksha: AJ's first parental daughter-in-law (2020–present) 
 Keerthi Jai Dhanush (2020-2021) as Maya: AJ's second parental daughter-in-law, Kavita Vaari replaced Keerthi as Maya (2021–present)
 Madhu Krishnan as Chitra: AJ's third parental daughter-in-law (2020–present)
 Krishnaveni as Jayapradha aka Jayamma: AJ's mother (2020–present)
 Tonisha Kapileswarapu as Anjali: Bhanu's half-sister (2020–present)
 Madhavi Latha as Kanyakumari: Bhanu's step-mother and Anjali's mother (2020–present)
 Komma Naveen as Kishor: AJ's son and Maya's husband (2020–present)
 Charan as Vardhan: AJ's son and Dhaksha's husband (2020–present)
 Kosaraju Aditya as Raju: Bhanu and Anjali's father and Kanyakumari's husband (2020–present)
 Venkatt Ch as Bhadri: Anjali's ex-lover and Sindhu's husband (2020–present)
 Yamini Bandaru as Sindhu: Bhadri's wife (2020–present) 
 Prince Yawar as Vishnu: Anjali's Husband (2021–present)
 Prabhakar as Appala Konda: AJ's Enemy & a cook (2021–present)
 Aadhya Parachuri as Shruthi: Doctor (2021–present)
 Bramar as Suraj (2021–present)
 Vasudha as Nandini: Raghuram's cousin (2021–present)
 Sridevi as Lucky: Raghuram's cousin (2021–present)
 Ritesh as Raghuram (2021–present)

Cameo Appearance
Manjula Paritala as Pravallika: AJ's first wife (photographic appearance)
Krishna Baghavan as Don Bhagavan
Shobha Shetty as Devayani: AJ's enemy 
Posani Krishna Murali as Dubai Raja (Bhanu's Uncle)

Hitler Pelli Gola
Anusha Hedge as Surya 'Suryakantham'
Siddu as Police Officer Adhithya
Anushree as Meera
Madhubala as Mrudula
Rithvika as Shambhavi
Amardeep Chowdary as Amar

Adaptations

References

External links
 Official website

Indian television series
Telugu-language television shows
Indian television soap operas
Zee Telugu original programming
2020 Indian television series debuts
2022 Indian television series endings